Christopher Null is an American writer, film critic, and columnist. A former blogger for Yahoo! Tech, he was the editor of Drinkhacker.com, and the founder and editor-in-chief of Filmcritic.com, which operated from 1995 to 2012. In 2003, CNN called Null an "expert in media, business and technology". In 2013, Null founded Film Racket. He is a founding member of the Online Film Critics Society.

Early life
Null obtained an MBA at the University of Texas at Austin.

Career
Null has written for numerous publications, including Wired, Business 2.0, PC World, Men's Journal, San Francisco Magazine, Yahoo! Internet Life, Working Woman, PC/Computing, San Jose Magazine, The Austin Chronicle, and The Austin American-Statesman. He is also the author of two books: Five Stars! (2005, Sutro Press), a manual for aspiring film critics, and Half Mast (2002, Sutro Press), a novel. A list of Null's publications is available at his website.

Prior to writing for Yahoo!, he was the founding editor-in-chief of Mobile PC magazine. He also served as editor-in-chief of New Architect, Executive Editor of Smart Business magazine, and Managing Reviews Editor of LAN Times magazine.

References

External links
 
 

1971 births
Living people
21st-century American non-fiction writers
American bloggers
American film critics
American magazine editors
Online Film Critics Society
Place of birth missing (living people)